The 1950 Buffalo Bulls football team was an American football team that represented the University of Buffalo as an independent during the 1950 college football season. In their third season under head coach James B. Wilson, the Bulls compiled a 5–3 record and outscored opponents by a total of 191 to 129. The team played its home games at Civic Stadium in Buffalo, New York.

Schedule

References

Buffalo Bulls
Buffalo Bulls football seasons
Buffalo Bulls football